Antony King (born 1974) is a British live audio engineer for Depeche Mode and Nine Inch Nails. He has also worked as front of house engineer for The Cure, Noel Gallagher's High Flying Birds, Prince, The Weeknd, Lana Del Rey, Toto, T Bone Burnett, Kanye West, Band of Horses, Swedish House Mafia, ,Zayn, Beck, Marilyn Manson, The Faces, and Simply Red.

Antony was born in 1974 in Ottawa, Canada and grew up near Paris, France. While attending Royal Holloway, University of London, Antony began working as a freelance audio engineer. He then joined London-based live audio production company Britannia Row Productions.  Antony was Amy Winehouse’s monitor engineer for her last tour in 2009.

Antony joined up with The Cure in 2007, mixing front of house for them for their 2007 "4 Play Tour" and their 2009 Australian "The Cure Reflections" where the band performed their first 3 albums in their entirety.  Antony was front of house engineer for Depeche Mode's 2009-2010 Tour of the Universe world tour and their latest 2013-2014 Delta Machine world tour. The extremely successful Delta Machine tour played to over 2.4 million people in stadiums and arenas in 32 countries. In addition, Antony mixed the 2009 Depeche Mode Tour of the Universe: Barcelona 20/21.11.09 DVD with Kerry Hopwood and Christian Eigner.

In 2011, Antony became front of house engineer for Noel Gallagher from Oasis’ new project, Noel Gallagher's High Flying Birds and toured worldwide with them from 2011-2012. In April 2014, Antony became front of house engineer for legendary electronic band Nine Inch Nails on their US and European tour with Soundgarden.

In 2013, Antony was nominated for Pro Sound Awards' Live/Touring Sound Engineer of the Year. Antony has recently been nominated for a 30th Annual Technical Excellence & Creativity (TEC) Award in Outstanding Creative Achievement in the category of Tour/Event Sound Production for his work on the 2014 Nine Inch Nails and Soundgarden tour.

In 2017 and 2018, Antony was FOH Engineer for Depeche Mode's "Global Spirit Tour," which played to 3 million fans and accrued over $202 million in boxoffice earnings.

Antony used a Solid State Logic L500 Plus mixing console on the Depeche Mode "Global Spirit Tour." His outboard rack gear included Warm Audio WA76's on Dave Gahan and Martin Gore’s vocals; a TC Electronic M6000; TC Electronic D2 controlled via MIDI from the desk; a Warm Audio WA2A and an EQP-WA on the bass; SPL Transient Designers on the drums; Chandler TG1 on the drum overheads; Smart C2 over the Left and Right. For system EQ, he used a Dolby Lake. He also used a Beyerdynamic TG 1000 digital wireless system and an L-Acoustics K1 system.

In September 2022, Antony mixed FOH for the Foo Fighters Taylor Hawkins tribute show at Wembley Stadium with Paul McCartney, Liam Gallagher, The Pretenders, and members of Queen, Metallica, and AC/D. 

He currently divides his time between London and Los Angeles, CA.

References

1974 births
Living people
British audio engineers
Alumni of Royal Holloway, University of London
Audio engineers